Chevington railway station served the village of West Chevington, Northumberland, England from 1847 to 1964 on the East Coast Main Line.

History 
The station was opened on 1 July 1847 by the Newcastle and Berwick Railway. The station was situated on both sides of the level crossing on an unnamed lane about half-a-mile south west of the hamlet of West Chevington.

Passenger services to Amble were replaced by bus services on 7 July 1930. In 1951 only 982 tickets were sold, an average of three per day. The station was closed to passengers on 15 September 1958 and closed completely on 10 August 1964 when goods traffic ceased.

Accidents
An accident occurred on 13 September 1913, to the south of the station, when the 11:45pm express from London to Edinburgh train derailed. Its speed was between 55 and 60mph. None of the vehicles were overturned and nobody was injured in the derailment yet one person sprained their ankle when alighting from the carriage.

References

External links 

Disused railway stations in Northumberland
Former North Eastern Railway (UK) stations
Railway stations in Great Britain opened in 1847
Railway stations in Great Britain closed in 1958
1870 establishments in England
1964 disestablishments in England